St. Joseph Higher Secondary School is a Catholic higher secondary school in 97 Asad Avenue Mohammadpur, Dhaka, Bangladesh. It is a mono-ed (boys') school offering education from third grade to twelfth grade, averaging 8–18 years of age. The school is a single shift(morning) school with over 2500 students.

Established in 1954 as the "St. Joseph English Medium School" in 16 Monir Hossain Lane, Narinda in the current old part of Dhaka by the Congregation of Holy Cross missionaries, the institution had a General Certificate of Education (GCE) based education structure. The current campus is at 97, Asad Avenue, Mohammedpur, Dhaka.

History
St. Joseph celebrated its Golden Jubilee in 2004 at the school campus. On 19 March 2014, St. Joseph celebrated its 60th anniversary of establishment.

Architecture
Robert Boughey: An American architect born in Pennsylvania, US. He completed his Bachelor of Architecture from Pratt Institute, Brooklyn, New York in 1959 and received Diploma in Tropical Studies from AA School of Architecture, London in 1967. He is a former research professor of architecture at Pratt institute.

Academic identification
Having both primary and secondary education level, this institution also offers higher secondary education from 2001. The secondary level has both science and commerce version. The higher secondary level includes humanities too. All the levels have both Bengali and English language versions, each class having two Bengali and one English version sections. Besides, from the year 2017, it has restarted the English medium section of the school named St. Joseph International School following the Cambridge Curriculum.

Admission
The school section admission goes through three levels; interview, written test and final selection. The principal personally interviews every single applicant. Admission into class 3 is held officially, around 2500-6000 competing for around 160-180 seats. Other classes (4-9) may offer admissions if seats are vacant.

The college section usually selects only 600-700 students out of approximately 7000 applicants through one of the most competitive written and viva exams in the country.

Curriculum
The school follows the National Curriculum of studies. Upon establishment, it was an English Medium Cambridge school. Following the independence of Bangladesh in 1971, the school abridged itself along with the national curriculum. In the year 2004, it introduced the English Version first in grade 6, gradually adding one English version section to each grade.

The school was initially named "St. Joseph High School". In the year 2001 Higher Secondary Education (equivalent to college) had also been introduced in Saint Joseph, changing the name of the institution to "Saint Joseph Higher Secondary School". The school is recognized by the Board of Secondary and Higher Secondary Education, Dhaka, Bangladesh. The average graduating class from Saint Joseph each year has 160 to 170 students. The secondary level offers S.S.C (equivalent to O level) examinations and the higher secondary level offers H.S.C (equivalent to A level) examinations. The curriculum includes both Bengali and English versions (not to be confused with English Medium). The institution is recognized by the Board of Intermediate and Higher Secondary Educations.

Grades and classes
Instead of Section 1, 2, 3 or A, B, C etc. St. Joseph uses names for its sections of grades. There are three sections for grades 3–10, and there are six sections for grades 11–12. In the school section, each class contains 50-60 students.

Uniform
The uniform consists of white shirt, dark grey trousers and black shoes. In winter, students are allowed to wear pullovers or blazers, but the pullovers or blazers must be navy blue.

School grounds

Outdoors
The school has a 3.5 acre campus. It has grounds for association football, basketball, cricket, and volleyball, among other sports. The school basketball court, built in the 60s and modified in 2008, also serves as a multipurpose auditorium.

Campus and buildings

A composite of two four-storied buildings with a two-storied building in the annex for teachers and office comprise the campus. The buildings are known as north and south building. The ground floor of the south building serves as a table tennis court. The school has three main entries. One serves as the entry for students, one for official purpose. The other entry is currently unused.

Laboratories

St. Joseph has some of the best high school lab facilities in the country. The Biology labs and the chemistry labs are well-equipped and are large in size. Some schools and educational institutions as Edexcel use these facilities for their students. Facilities include two computer labs equipped with multimedia projectors, a separate internet lab, two advanced chemistry labs, two physics labs and two biology labs. Of each of the chemistry, physics and biology labs one is used by the secondary students and the other is by higher secondary students.

Library
The library was founded by Brother Lorenzo, CSC in 1954. It has approximately 10 thousand books and magazines.  The library works with the Bishwa Sahitya Kendra and British Council to arrange book reading programs. The library is operated by two librarians and a team of student volunteers.

Purposes of the campus
The school buildings are solely dedicated for the teaching of its students. The southwest corner of the school holds a small hostel for the brothers of Holycross.
Since 2004, the school has been hosting the national occurrence of Bangladesh Mathematical Olympiad.

Achievements
 13 UNSW medal won in 2007,

Headmasters and principals
 Late Brother Jude Costello, C.S.C. (1954–1962)
 Late Brother Gerald Kraeger, C.S.C. (1963–1967 and 1969–1972)
 Late Brother Thomas O'Linn C.S.C. (1967–1969)
 Late Brother Ralph Baird, C.S.C  (1979–1985)
 Late Brother John Stephen, C.S.C. (1985–1987)
 Late Brother Thomas Moore, C.S.C. (1973–1978 and 1987–1988)
 Brother Nicholas Thielman, C.S.C. (1987–1989)
 Late Brother John Rozario, C.S.C. (1990–2007) (Ex-Principal Emeritus)
 Dr. Brother Leo James Pereira, C.S.C. (2007–2011)
 Late Dr. Brother Harold B. Rodrigues, C.S.C. (2011–2012)
 Late Brother Robi Purification, C.S.C. (2012–2020)
 Dr. Brother Subal Lawrence Rozario, C.S.C.(2022-2022)
 Dr. Brother Leo James Pereira, C.S.C. (2020-2021 and 2022–Present) [2nd and 5th Principal]

Past and current faculties
Starting its journey with a handful of American Brothers from Congregation of Holy Cross, the school received the services of a large number of teachers both before and after integrating itself with the secondary education system in Bangladesh. The current faculty consists of 50 Secondary Section teachers, 25 Higher Secondary Section teachers, a counselor, two Prefects of Discipline, two librarians, office staffs, two sports instructors, and individual coaches for the soccer, basketball and cricket teams. Dr. Bro. Subal Lawrence Rozario, CSC is the current principal of the school. Br. Victor Bikash D'Rozario, CSC and Br. Rocy J. Costa are the current vice-principals of the school.

Extracurricular units
To ease and remove regular class monotony, St. Joseph provides students with an array of extra-curricular and co-curricular activities. Students can explore their latent talents through participating in the activities of various clubs such as the Scintilla Science Club, Josephite Debating Club, Josephite Language and Reading Club, Business Club, Josephite Chess Club, Josephite Eco Earth Club, Interact Club, Cultural Forum, Drama Group, Computer Club. Each club arranges and organizes seminars, workshops, symposiums, fairs and functions all the year round.

Scouting
Scouting was introduced in St. Joseph in 1964 with a view to creating among the students a sense of sensitivity, sympathy, fellow feeling, camaraderie, benevolence, generosity and rationality towards the deprived, distressed, underprivileged and the marginalized. It teaches an individual to become self-reliant by honest means. It instigates good human qualities in the individuals to make them prepared for people in their times of crying need. The scout groups of St. Joseph have participated in numerous camps, rallies, jamborees at home and abroad. Many of the scouts have camped in countries like Australia, India, Nepal, Pakistan, the Maldives, Thailand, Malaysia and Singapore. Usually two regular camps are arranged in a year, one in the school campus and the other outside Dhaka.

Literacy School
As a part of its continued strides towards humanitarian and social services, St. Joseph runs a Literacy School at its premises in the afternoon to impart free primary education to the underprivileged children of the slums and Geneva Camps around Mohammadpur area. This Literacy School was founded in 1978 by Brother Nicolas Thiemann, CSC. Students can get free education up to class-V from this school. The classes are held on every Sunday, Monday, Tuesday, Wednesday and Thursday. The school starts at 2:30 p.m. and breaks at 5:00 p.m. Besides basic literacy skills, they are taught discipline, good manners, moral and social values.

Publications
The Josephite is the yearbook of St. Joseph published annually to record the activities of the institution all the year round. The contents of the yearly magazine include massages from the Archbishop, Principal, Vice-Principal, Counselor and Students’ Guidance, editor and student editor, photographs of the teachers, photographs of all students (III-XII), photographs of the activities of the students, events and programs, individual writings of the students in both Bengali and English and so on. The Josephite is thought to have been first published in 1967 and since then it has been published every year to display the activities and performance of the students.

Sports and games
Football, cricket, basketball, volleyball, table tennis, badminton, chess are the most common sports and games held almost regularly on the ground. St. Joseph has produce players such as Shahriar Nafees (cricketer) and Grand Master Reefat Bin Sattar.

On the annual sports day, a number of traditional track and field events are organised for both the students and teachers. These include long jump, high jump, triple jump, shot put, discus throwing, relay race, 100-metre sprint, 200-metre sprint, 400-metre sprint, 800-metre sprint, 1500-metre sprint, dress as you like and tug-of war.

Excursions
St. Joseph always looks to ways of improving students physically, mentally and socially. With this view in mind, St. Joseph allows and encourages students to go on picnics, study tours or excursions either on campus or out of campus or even outside the country. Each class (classes-III to X) arranges picnic or study tour either on campus or out of campus. This gives students an opportunity to get close to their teachers and discover them more outside the class.

A four-day-long study tour to Chittagong-Cox's Bazar-St. Martin for the students of class-XI is the most exciting and enjoyable event. From this tour students can gain a good deal of practical knowledge, life-time experience and unforgettable pleasure. They have opportunities to learn a lot besides merely sight-seeing, wallowing in the seawater or enjoying different foods.

Notable alumni

Education
 Mohammed Omar Ejaz Rahman, adjunct professor of demography and epidemiology, Harvard 
 Mushfiq Mobarak, professor of economics, Yale University 
 Asif Azam Siddiqi, space historian, currently serves as an assistant professor of history at Fordham University
 Jalal Alamgir, academic and an associate professor of political science at the University of Massachusetts-Boston

Music
 Tahsan Rahman Khan, Bangladeshi singer, songwriter, actor, composer, model

Sports & Games
 Shahriar Nafees, Bangladeshi cricketer, who plays all formats of the game and also a former Twenty20 International captain for Bangladesh
 Reefat Bin Sattar, Bangladeshi chess grandmaster

Politics
 Anisul Huq (politician), Bangladeshi lawyer and politician who has been the Minister for Law, Justice and Parliamentary Affairs in the Cabinet of Bangladesh since 2014.
 Andaleeve Rahman is the President of the Bangladesh Jatiya Party, a ex Member of Parliament and the Principal of British School of Law in Dhaka.

Entrepreneur
 Omar Ishrak, chairman of Intel, chairman & CEO of Medtronic
 Mirza Ali Behrouze Ispahani, businessman from the Ispahani family and the chairman of M. M. Ispahani Limited

Others
 Naveed Mahbub, Bangladeshi comedian and columnist
 Khairul Anam Shakil, awarded Ekushey Padak in Music

Alumni association
The alumni of the school have formed the Saint Joseph Old Boys Foundation (SJOBF), which organizes events and programs.

The alumni of the school have formed the Josephites Foundation Canada, a North American foundation that accepts members from all over the world who are Josephites.

References

External links

 Official website

Holy Cross secondary schools
Catholic secondary schools in Bangladesh
Educational institutions established in 1954
Schools in Dhaka
1954 establishments in East Pakistan
Christianity in Dhaka